Lardo is a small chain of sandwich restaurants, based in Portland, Oregon.

Locations 
The first two restaurants opened in Southeast Portland's Hosford-Abernethy neighborhood and in downtown's West End. A third restaurant, sometimes referred to a Lardo North, opened along North Williams Avenue in 2014. The North Portland location closed in 2016.

References

External links 

 
 

Hosford-Abernethy, Portland, Oregon
Restaurants in Portland, Oregon
Sandwich restaurants
Southwest Portland, Oregon